Route 151 is a  east–west state highway in Massachusetts. The route is located on Cape Cod and runs through the towns of Falmouth and Mashpee.

Route 151 essentially acts as a bypass of the busier Route 28 through Falmouth and Mashpee centers. The route provides a more direct link for those wishing to travel from North Falmouth to Hyannis. In conjunction with Route 28, Route 151 also serves as an alternate route of U.S. Route 6 for those wishing to travel from the Bourne Bridge to Hyannis.

Route description

Route 151 begins at an intersection with Route 28A in North Falmouth. The roadway continues west from this intersection towards Buzzards Bay, but that portion is not signed as Route 151.

Route 151 proceeds east, and intersects with the freeway portion of Route 28 approximately  thereafter. The highway then proceeds eastward through the northern portion of Falmouth, roughly parallel to the town line between Falmouth and Bourne. Route 151 passes the village of Hatchville and the Barnstable County Fairgrounds, continuing east until it enters the town of Mashpee.

The highway passes many of Mashpee's municipal buildings, including the fire department, the police department, and the town library. As Route 151 approaches its eastern terminus, it becomes much more heavily developed, passing between and dividing the north and south sections of the Mashpee Commons shopping center. Just past Mashpee Commons, Route 151 ends at a rotary close to the geographic center of town, where it once again intersects with Route 28 (which is now running east-west).

Major intersections

External links

Neilbert.com Massachusetts Route Log

151
Transportation in Barnstable County, Massachusetts